A by-election was held for the New South Wales Legislative Assembly electorate of Bathurst on 21 December 1866 because James Kemp resigned.

Results

James Kemp resigned.

See also
Electoral results for the district of Bathurst
List of New South Wales state by-elections

References

1866 elections in Australia
New South Wales state by-elections
1860s in New South Wales